The 1922 Pittsburgh Pirates season was the 41st season of the Pittsburgh Pirates franchise; the 36th in the National League. The Pirates finished tied for 3rd place with the Cardinals in the league standings with a record of 85–69.

Regular season

Season standings

Record vs. opponents

Game log

|- bgcolor="ffbbbb"
| 1 || April 12 || @ Cardinals || 1–10 || Sherdel || Cooper (0–1) || — || 18,000 || 0–1
|- bgcolor="ffbbbb"
| 2 || April 13 || @ Cardinals || 4–8 || Doak || Glazner (0–1) || Barfoot || — || 0–2
|- bgcolor="ffbbbb"
| 3 || April 15 || @ Cardinals || 2–3 || Haines || Adams (0–1) || — || — || 0–3
|- bgcolor="ccffcc"
| 4 || April 16 || @ Reds || 4–3 || Cooper (1–1) || Rixey || — || — || 1–3
|- bgcolor="ccffcc"
| 5 || April 17 || @ Reds || 1–0 || Morrison (1–0) || Luque || — || — || 2–3
|- bgcolor="ccffcc"
| 6 || April 18 || @ Reds || 8–4 || Carlson (1–0) || Markle || Hamilton (1) || — || 3–3
|- bgcolor="ccffcc"
| 7 || April 20 || Cardinals || 10–5 || Cooper (2–1) || Barfoot || Adams (1) || — || 4–3
|- bgcolor="ccffcc"
| 8 || April 22 || Cardinals || 14–2 || Morrison (2–0) || Haines || — || — || 5–3
|- bgcolor="ccffcc"
| 9 || April 23 || @ Cubs || 14–3 || Carlson (2–0) || Jones || — || — || 6–3
|- bgcolor="ffbbbb"
| 10 || April 24 || @ Cubs || 2–4 || Aldridge || Cooper (2–2) || — || — || 6–4
|- bgcolor="ffbbbb"
| 11 || April 26 || @ Cubs || 3–4 (10) || Alexander || Adams (0–2) || — || — || 6–5
|- bgcolor="ffbbbb"
| 12 || April 27 || Reds || 5–8 || Luque || Morrison (2–1) || Donohue || — || 6–6
|- bgcolor="ffbbbb"
| 13 || April 28 || Reds || 3–5 || Couch || Carlson (2–1) || — || — || 6–7
|- bgcolor="ccffcc"
| 14 || April 29 || Reds || 7–3 || Cooper (3–2) || Rixey || — || — || 7–7
|- bgcolor="ffbbbb"
| 15 || April 30 || @ Reds || 1–3 || Donohue || Glazner (0–2) || — || — || 7–8
|-

|- bgcolor="ccffcc"
| 16 || May 1 || @ Reds || 7–6 || Adams (1–2) || Luque || Hamilton (2) || — || 8–8
|- bgcolor="ffbbbb"
| 17 || May 2 || @ Reds || 2–9 || Couch || Carlson (2–2) || — || — || 8–9
|- bgcolor="ccffcc"
| 18 || May 5 || Cubs || 3–1 || Cooper (4–2) || Jones || — || — || 9–9
|- bgcolor="ffbbbb"
| 19 || May 6 || Cubs || 7–11 || Aldridge || Glazner (0–3) || — || — || 9–10
|- bgcolor="ccffcc"
| 20 || May 7 || @ Cubs || 11–5 || Carlson (3–2) || Alexander || — || — || 10–10
|- bgcolor="ccffcc"
| 21 || May 8 || Robins || 8–7 || Yellow Horse (1–0) || Grimes || — || — || 11–10
|- bgcolor="ccffcc"
| 22 || May 9 || Robins || 8–2 || Cooper (5–2) || Cadore || — || 6,000 || 12–10
|- bgcolor="ccffcc"
| 23 || May 11 || Robins || 12–6 || Adams (2–2) || Vance || — || 7,000 || 13–10
|- bgcolor="ccffcc"
| 24 || May 12 || Braves || 5–3 || Yellow Horse (2–0) || Watson || — || — || 14–10
|- bgcolor="ffbbbb"
| 25 || May 13 || Braves || 5–8 || McQuillan || Cooper (5–3) || — || — || 14–11
|- bgcolor="ccffcc"
| 26 || May 15 || Braves || 6–5 (10) || Carlson (4–2) || Oeschger || — || — || 15–11
|- bgcolor="ffbbbb"
| 27 || May 16 || Braves || 5–7 (12) || Miller || Cooper (5–4) || — || — || 15–12
|- bgcolor="ccffcc"
| 28 || May 20 || Giants || 10–7 || Carlson (5–2) || Ryan || Glazner (1) || 25,000 || 16–12
|- bgcolor="ccffcc"
| 29 || May 22 || Phillies || 5–0 || Cooper (6–4) || Hubbell || — || — || 17–12
|- bgcolor="ccffcc"
| 30 || May 23 || Phillies || 10–3 || Morrison (3–1) || Smith || — || — || 18–12
|- bgcolor="ccffcc"
| 31 || May 24 || Phillies || 11–4 (8) || Carlson (6–2) || Ring || — || — || 19–12
|- bgcolor="ccffcc"
| 32 || May 25 || @ Cardinals || 7–3 || Glazner (1–3) || Sherdel || — || — || 20–12
|- bgcolor="ffbbbb"
| 33 || May 26 || @ Cardinals || 2–6 || Doak || Cooper (6–5) || — || — || 20–13
|- bgcolor="ffbbbb"
| 34 || May 27 || @ Cardinals || 2–3 || Sherdel || Adams (2–3) || — || — || 20–14
|- bgcolor="ccffcc"
| 35 || May 27 || @ Cardinals || 3–2 (10) || Hamilton (1–0) || Pfeffer || Morrison (1) || — || 21–14
|- bgcolor="ffbbbb"
| 36 || May 28 || @ Cardinals || 3–4 || Pertica || Carlson (6–3) || — || — || 21–15
|- bgcolor="ccffcc"
| 37 || May 29 || Reds || 5–2 || Glazner (2–3) || Donohue || — || — || 22–15
|- bgcolor="ffbbbb"
| 38 || May 30 || Reds || 3–9 || Rixey || Cooper (6–6) || — || — || 22–16
|- bgcolor="ccffcc"
| 39 || May 30 || Reds || 7–3 || Morrison (4–1) || Keck || — || — || 23–16
|- bgcolor="ccffcc"
| 40 || May 31 || Reds || 11–2 || Hamilton (2–0) || Couch || — || — || 24–16
|-

|- bgcolor="ffbbbb"
| 41 || June 1 || Cardinals || 2–3 || Pfeffer || Carlson (6–4) || Barfoot || — || 24–17
|- bgcolor="ffbbbb"
| 42 || June 3 || Cardinals || 6–9 || Pertica || Adams (2–4) || — || 19,000 || 24–18
|- bgcolor="ccffcc"
| 43 || June 7 || @ Phillies || 5–0 || Morrison (5–1) || Meadows || — || — || 25–18
|- bgcolor="ccffcc"
| 44 || June 8 || @ Phillies || 7–5 || Carlson (7–4) || Ring || — || — || 26–18
|- bgcolor="ffbbbb"
| 45 || June 9 || @ Braves || 3–7 || Oeschger || Cooper (6–7) || — || — || 26–19
|- bgcolor="ccffcc"
| 46 || June 10 || @ Braves || 9–1 || Glazner (3–3) || Watson || — || — || 27–19
|- bgcolor="ffbbbb"
| 47 || June 12 || @ Braves || 2–11 || Miller || Morrison (5–2) || — || — || 27–20
|- bgcolor="ffbbbb"
| 48 || June 13 || @ Braves || 5–8 || Marquard || Cooper (6–8) || McQuillan || — || 27–21
|- bgcolor="ffbbbb"
| 49 || June 14 || @ Giants || 0–13 || Douglas || Carlson (7–5) || — || 10,000 || 27–22
|- bgcolor="ffbbbb"
| 50 || June 15 || @ Giants || 2–4 || Ryan || Adams (2–5) || — || 8,000 || 27–23
|- bgcolor="ffbbbb"
| 51 || June 16 || @ Giants || 1–7 || Barnes || Glazner (3–4) || — || 8,000 || 27–24
|- bgcolor="ffbbbb"
| 52 || June 17 || @ Giants || 1–2 (10) || Nehf || Morrison (5–3) || — || 15,000 || 27–25
|- bgcolor="ccffcc"
| 53 || June 18 || @ Robins || 2–0 (6) || Cooper (7–8) || Ruether || — || 18,000 || 28–25
|- bgcolor="ffbbbb"
| 54 || June 19 || @ Robins || 5–6 (14) || Decatur || Hamilton (2–1) || — || 3,500 || 28–26
|- bgcolor="ffbbbb"
| 55 || June 21 || @ Robins || 14–15 (10) || Grimes || Adams (2–6) || — || 3,500 || 28–27
|- bgcolor="ccffcc"
| 56 || June 22 || Cubs || 8–6 || Cooper (8–8) || Alexander || Carlson (1) || — || 29–27
|- bgcolor="ffbbbb"
| 57 || June 23 || Reds || 2–6 || Rixey || Morrison (5–4) || — || — || 29–28
|- bgcolor="ffbbbb"
| 58 || June 24 || Reds || 3–7 || Luque || Glazner (3–5) || Keck || — || 29–29
|- bgcolor="ffbbbb"
| 59 || June 25 || @ Reds || 4–7 || Couch || Carlson (7–6) || — || — || 29–30
|- bgcolor="ffbbbb"
| 60 || June 26 || @ Cubs || 4–6 || Stueland || Morrison (5–5) || — || — || 29–31
|- bgcolor="ccffcc"
| 61 || June 27 || @ Cubs || 6–1 || Cooper (9–8) || Cheeves || — || — || 30–31
|- bgcolor="ccffcc"
| 62 || June 27 || @ Cubs || 7–6 || Glazner (4–5) || Alexander || Carlson (2) || 9,000 || 31–31
|- bgcolor="ccffcc"
| 63 || June 28 || @ Cubs || 7–2 || Hamilton (3–1) || Aldridge || — || — || 32–31
|- bgcolor="ffbbbb"
| 64 || June 29 || Cardinals || 5–8 || Haines || Carlson (7–7) || — || 5,000 || 32–32
|- bgcolor="ffbbbb"
| 65 || June 30 || Cardinals || 0–6 || Sherdel || Morrison (5–6) || — || — || 32–33
|-

|- bgcolor="ffbbbb"
| 66 || July 1 || Cardinals || 5–9 || Doak || Cooper (9–9) || North || — || 32–34
|- bgcolor="ccffcc"
| 67 || July 1 || Cardinals || 9–8 || Adams (3–6) || Pertica || Carlson (3) || — || 33–34
|- bgcolor="ffbbbb"
| 68 || July 2 || @ Cubs || 1–5 || Alexander || Hamilton (3–2) || — || 8,000 || 33–35
|- bgcolor="ccffcc"
| 69 || July 3 || Cubs || 5–2 || Yellow Horse (3–0) || Stueland || — || — || 34–35
|- bgcolor="ffbbbb"
| 70 || July 4 || Cubs || 4–8 || Cheeves || Glazner (4–6) || Osborne || — || 34–36
|- bgcolor="ffbbbb"
| 71 || July 4 || Cubs || 0–8 || Aldridge || Morrison (5–7) || — || — || 34–37
|- bgcolor="ffbbbb"
| 72 || July 5 || Cubs || 5–11 || Jones || Carlson (7–8) || — || — || 34–38
|- bgcolor="ffbbbb"
| 73 || July 6 || Giants || 3–6 || Nehf || Adams (3–7) || — || 4,000 || 34–39
|- bgcolor="ffbbbb"
| 74 || July 7 || Giants || 8–9 (18) || Ryan || Morrison (5–8) || — || 4,000 || 34–40
|- bgcolor="ccffcc"
| 75 || July 8 || Giants || 7–5 || Cooper (10–9) || Toney || — || 10,000 || 35–40
|- bgcolor="ffbbbb"
| 76 || July 10 || Giants || 2–19 || Nehf || Hamilton (3–3) || — || 15,000 || 35–41
|- bgcolor="ccffcc"
| 77 || July 10 || Giants || 5–4 || Carlson (8–8) || Ryan || — || — || 36–41
|- bgcolor="ffbbbb"
| 78 || July 11 || Braves || 4–10 || McQuillan || Morrison (5–9) || — || — || 36–42
|- bgcolor="ffbbbb"
| 79 || July 12 || Braves || 3–4 || Watson || Yellow Horse (3–1) || Miller || — || 36–43
|- bgcolor="ccffcc"
| 80 || July 14 || Braves || 6–1 || Cooper (11–9) || Marquard || — || — || 37–43
|- bgcolor="ccffcc"
| 81 || July 15 || Robins || 3–2 (10) || Morrison (6–9) || Smith || — || 12,000 || 38–43
|- bgcolor="ffbbbb"
| 82 || July 16 || @ Robins || 2–6 || Grimes || Carlson (8–9) || — || 8,000 || 38–44
|- bgcolor="ccffcc"
| 83 || July 17 || Robins || 8–5 || Hamilton (4–3) || Vance || — || 3,500 || 39–44
|- bgcolor="ccffcc"
| 84 || July 19 || Phillies || 2–0 || Cooper (12–9) || Hubbell || — || — || 40–44
|- bgcolor="ccffcc"
| 85 || July 20 || Phillies || 2–1 (12) || Glazner (5–6) || Weinert || — || — || 41–44
|- bgcolor="ccffcc"
| 86 || July 21 || Phillies || 6–0 || Morrison (7–9) || Ring || — || — || 42–44
|- bgcolor="ccffcc"
| 87 || July 22 || Phillies || 8–7 || Hamilton (5–3) || Meadows || — || — || 43–44
|- bgcolor="ccffcc"
| 88 || July 24 || Giants || 3–2 || Cooper (13–9) || Barnes || — || — || 44–44
|- bgcolor="ffbbbb"
| 89 || July 24 || Giants || 4–11 || Nehf || Carlson (8–10) || — || 20,000 || 44–45
|- bgcolor="ccffcc"
| 90 || July 25 || @ Robins || 5–3 || Morrison (8–9) || Grimes || — || 2,000 || 45–45
|- bgcolor="ffbbbb"
| 91 || July 26 || @ Robins || 0–7 || Ruether || Glazner (5–7) || — || 2,500 || 45–46
|- bgcolor="ffbbbb"
| 92 || July 28 || @ Robins || 2–3 || Vance || Adams (3–8) || — || 3,000 || 45–47
|- bgcolor="ccffcc"
| 93 || July 29 || @ Giants || 8–3 || Cooper (14–9) || Toney || — || — || 46–47
|- bgcolor="ccffcc"
| 94 || July 30 || @ Giants || 7–0 || Morrison (9–9) || Douglas || — || 25,000 || 47–47
|- bgcolor="ccffcc"
| 95 || July 31 || @ Giants || 12–5 || Hamilton (6–3) || Barnes || — || 3,000 || 48–47
|-

|- bgcolor="ccffcc"
| 96 || August 1 || @ Giants || 10–2 || Cooper (15–9) || Ryan || — || 8,000 || 49–47
|- bgcolor="ccffcc"
| 97 || August 3 || @ Braves || 5–1 || Glazner (6–7) || Watson || — || — || 50–47
|- bgcolor="ccffcc"
| 98 || August 4 || @ Braves || 3–0 (8) || Adams (4–8) || Miller || — || — || 51–47
|- bgcolor="ccffcc"
| 99 || August 5 || @ Braves || 9–3 || Morrison (10–9) || Marquard || — || — || 52–47
|- bgcolor="ccffcc"
| 100 || August 7 || @ Phillies || 17–10 || Glazner (7–7) || Singleton || — || — || 53–47
|- bgcolor="ccffcc"
| 101 || August 8 || @ Phillies || 19–8 || Hamilton (7–3) || Meadows || — || — || 54–47
|- bgcolor="ccffcc"
| 102 || August 8 || @ Phillies || 7–3 || Morrison (11–9) || Winters || — || — || 55–47
|- bgcolor="ccffcc"
| 103 || August 10 || @ Phillies || 14–4 || Carlson (9–10) || Ring || — || — || 56–47
|- bgcolor="ccffcc"
| 104 || August 11 || Reds || 7–1 || Cooper (16–9) || Luque || — || — || 57–47
|- bgcolor="ccffcc"
| 105 || August 12 || Reds || 6–0 || Adams (5–8) || Rixey || — || — || 58–47
|- bgcolor="ffbbbb"
| 106 || August 13 || @ Reds || 4–5 (10) || Luque || Hamilton (7–4) || — || — || 58–48
|- bgcolor="ffbbbb"
| 107 || August 14 || Phillies || 1–10 || Winters || Glazner (7–8) || — || — || 58–49
|- bgcolor="ccffcc"
| 108 || August 15 || Giants || 6–2 || Cooper (17–9) || Nehf || — || 25,000 || 59–49
|- bgcolor="ffbbbb"
| 109 || August 16 || Giants || 6–7 || Scott || Hamilton (7–5) || Nehf || 16,000 || 59–50
|- bgcolor="ffbbbb"
| 110 || August 17 || Giants || 3–6 || McQuillan || Morrison (11–10) || — || 20,000 || 59–51
|- bgcolor="ffbbbb"
| 111 || August 18 || Braves || 2–5 || Miller || Cooper (17–10) || — || — || 59–52
|- bgcolor="ffbbbb"
| 112 || August 19 || Braves || 1–4 || Braxton || Adams (5–9) || — || — || 59–53
|- bgcolor="ccffcc"
| 113 || August 19 || Braves || 8–2 || Brown (1–0) || Watson || — || — || 60–53
|- bgcolor="ccffcc"
| 114 || August 21 || Braves || 5–1 || Hamilton (8–5) || Oeschger || — || — || 61–53
|- bgcolor="ccffcc"
| 115 || August 22 || Phillies || 4–3 || Morrison (12–10) || Meadows || — || — || 62–53
|- bgcolor="ccffcc"
| 116 || August 23 || Phillies || 11–3 || Cooper (18–10) || Hubbell || — || — || 63–53
|- bgcolor="ccffcc"
| 117 || August 24 || Phillies || 10–4 || Brown (2–0) || Winters || — || — || 64–53
|- bgcolor="ffbbbb"
| 118 || August 25 || Robins || 7–8 || Decatur || Carlson (9–11) || — || 4,000 || 64–54
|- bgcolor="ffbbbb"
| 119 || August 25 || Robins || 6–8 || Cadore || Glazner (7–9) || — || 8,000 || 64–55
|- bgcolor="ccffcc"
| 120 || August 26 || Robins || 7–5 || Morrison (13–10) || Mamaux || — || 8,000 || 65–55
|- bgcolor="ccffcc"
| 121 || August 28 || Robins || 4–3 (11) || Cooper (19–10) || Vance || — || — || 66–55
|- bgcolor="ffbbbb"
| 122 || August 29 || Robins || 2–3 || Ruether || Hamilton (8–6) || — || 5,000 || 66–56
|- bgcolor="ccffcc"
| 123 || August 29 || Robins || 6–0 || Adams (6–9) || Cadore || — || 9,000 || 67–56
|- bgcolor="ccffcc"
| 124 || August 30 || @ Reds || 2–0 (8) || Glazner (8–9) || Rixey || — || — || 68–56
|-

|- bgcolor="ccffcc"
| 125 || September 1 || @ Cardinals || 14–4 || Morrison (14–10) || Doak || — || — || 69–56
|- bgcolor="ffbbbb"
| 126 || September 1 || @ Cardinals || 6–11 || Sell || Cooper (19–11) || Pfeffer || — || 69–57
|- bgcolor="ccffcc"
| 127 || September 2 || @ Cardinals || 9–5 || Brown (3–0) || Sherdel || Carlson (4) || — || 70–57
|- bgcolor="ccffcc"
| 128 || September 3 || @ Cubs || 2–0 (11) || Hamilton (9–6) || Alexander || — || — || 71–57
|- bgcolor="ffbbbb"
| 129 || September 4 || Cardinals || 3–5 || Pfeffer || Adams (6–10) || — || — || 71–58
|- bgcolor="ccffcc"
| 130 || September 4 || Cardinals || 6–5 || Glazner (9–9) || Barfoot || — || — || 72–58
|- bgcolor="ccffcc"
| 131 || September 5 || Cardinals || 11–0 || Morrison (15–10) || Sell || — || — || 73–58
|- bgcolor="ccffcc"
| 132 || September 7 || Cubs || 6–0 || Cooper (20–11) || Stueland || — || — || 74–58
|- bgcolor="ffbbbb"
| 133 || September 8 || Cubs || 7–10 || Cheeves || Brown (3–1) || Kaufmann || — || 74–59
|- bgcolor="ccffcc"
| 134 || September 9 || Cubs || 7–4 || Glazner (10–9) || Alexander || — || — || 75–59
|- bgcolor="ccffcc"
| 135 || September 9 || Cubs || 8–7 (10) || Hamilton (10–6) || Kaufmann || — || — || 76–59
|- bgcolor="ccffcc"
| 136 || September 13 || @ Braves || 8–1 || Cooper (21–11) || Oeschger || — || — || 77–59
|- bgcolor="ccffcc"
| 137 || September 13 || @ Braves || 6–1 || Morrison (16–10) || Cooney || — || — || 78–59
|- bgcolor="ccffcc"
| 138 || September 14 || @ Braves || 8–0 || Adams (7–10) || Miller || — || — || 79–59
|- bgcolor="ffbbbb"
| 139 || September 15 || @ Braves || 1–4 || Marquard || Glazner (10–10) || — || — || 79–60
|- bgcolor="ccffcc"
| 140 || September 16 || @ Phillies || 11–6 || Cooper (22–11) || Meadows || — || — || 80–60
|- bgcolor="ffbbbb"
| 141 || September 16 || @ Phillies || 6–8 || Behan || Carlson (9–12) || — || — || 80–61
|- bgcolor="ccffcc"
| 142 || September 18 || @ Phillies || 11–3 || Morrison (17–10) || Hubbell || — || — || 81–61
|- bgcolor="ffbbbb"
| 143 || September 18 || @ Phillies || 2–5 || Weinert || Hamilton (10–7) || — || — || 81–62
|- bgcolor="ccffcc"
| 144 || September 19 || @ Phillies || 6–1 || Glazner (11–10) || Ring || — || 1,000 || 82–62
|- bgcolor="ccffcc"
| 145 || September 20 || @ Giants || 4–1 || Cooper (23–11) || McQuillan || — || 15,000 || 83–62
|- bgcolor="ccffcc"
| 146 || September 21 || @ Giants || 6–1 || Hamilton (11–7) || Nehf || — || 15,000 || 84–62
|- bgcolor="ffbbbb"
| 147 || September 22 || @ Giants || 7–8 || McQuillan || Adams (7–11) || — || 15,000 || 84–63
|- bgcolor="ffbbbb"
| 148 || September 23 || @ Robins || 5–9 || Ruether || Glazner (11–11) || — || 15,000 || 84–64
|- bgcolor="ffbbbb"
| 149 || September 23 || @ Robins || 1–5 || Decatur || Cooper (23–12) || — || 20,000 || 84–65
|- bgcolor="ffbbbb"
| 150 || September 24 || @ Robins || 2–4 || Grimes || Morrison (17–11) || — || — || 84–66
|- bgcolor="ccffcc"
| 151 || September 24 || @ Robins || 11–3 (7) || Adams (8–11) || Cadore || — || 23,000 || 85–66
|- bgcolor="ffbbbb"
| 152 || September 27 || Cubs || 1–4 || Fussell || Cooper (23–13) || — || — || 85–67
|- bgcolor="ffffff"
| 153 || September 30 || @ Reds || 7–7 (10) ||  ||  || — || — || 85–67
|-

|- bgcolor="ffbbbb"
| 154 || October 1 || @ Reds || 4–5 || Markle || Cooper (23–14) || — || — || 85–68
|- bgcolor="ffbbbb"
| 155 || October 1 || @ Reds || 1–5 || Rixey || Glazner (11–12) || — || — || 85–69
|-

|-
| Legend:       = Win       = Loss       = TieBold = Pirates team member

Opening Day lineup

Roster

Player stats

Batting

Starters by position 
Note: Pos = Position; G = Games played; AB = At bats; H = Hits; Avg. = Batting average; HR = Home runs; RBI = Runs batted in

Other batters 
Note: G = Games played; AB = At bats; H = Hits; Avg. = Batting average; HR = Home runs; RBI = Runs batted in

Pitching

Starting pitchers 
Note: G = Games pitched; IP = Innings pitched; W = Wins; L = Losses; ERA = Earned run average; SO = Strikeouts

Other pitchers 
Note: G = Games pitched; IP = Innings pitched; W = Wins; L = Losses; ERA = Earned run average; SO = Strikeouts

Relief pitchers 
Note: G = Games pitched; W = Wins; L = Losses; SV = Saves; ERA = Earned run average; SO = Strikeouts

References 

 1922 Pittsburgh Pirates team page at Baseball Reference
 1922 Pittsburgh Pirates Page at Baseball Almanac

Pittsburgh Pirates seasons
Pittsburgh Pirates season
Pittsburg Pir